Justice Bipinchandra Jivanlal Divan (1919–2012) was an Indian statesman. He was the Chief Justice of Gujarat and Andhra Pradesh High Courts, and Acting Governor of Andhra Pradesh.

He was born on 20 August 1919. He was educated at Proprietary High School, Ahmedabad, Wilson College and Government Law College, Bombay and University School of Economics and Sociology, Bombay.

He was enrolled as an Advocate of Bombay High Court on the Appellate Side in September, 1941 and on the Original Side in September, 1943 and practiced there from 1943 to 1954. He was appointed judge, Bombay City Civil Court, and additional sessions judge, Greater Bombay, on 4 November 1954 and principal judge, Bombay City Civil Court, and sessions judge, Greater Bombay, on 1 May 1961.

The first 'centurion' blood donor from Ahmedabad, Diwan was born on 20 August 1919, educated at Proprietary High School in Ahmedabad and did his Master of Arts and LLB from a Mumbai-based college, Pallavi told DNA. Diwan was appointed judge at the civil court at the age of 35 and was High Court judge at 45.

He was appointed additional judge of Gujarat High Court from 19 April 1962 and made permanent judge with effect from 23 September 1963.

He was appointed chief justice, Gujarat High Court, from 17 July 1973. He was transferred to Andhra Pradesh High Court with effect from 1 July 1976. He was acting governor of Andhra Pradesh from 17 February 1977 till 5 May 1977. He was again transferred to Gujarat High Court as chief justice with effect from 28 August 1977 and retired on 20 August 1981.

He died on 12 March 2012.

References

20th-century Indian judges
Governors of Andhra Pradesh
1919 births
2012 deaths
Judges of the Gujarat High Court
Judges of the Andhra Pradesh High Court
Chief Justices of the Andhra Pradesh High Court
Chief Justices of the Gujarat High Court